Nityalila Saulo, or plainly Nityalila, is an independent Filipino singer-songwriter and multi-instrumentalist.

About
Nityalila Saulo is the daughter of owner and proprietor of Khumbmela & Yadu bags, Edwin "Yadu"  Saulo. She was born and raised in a family of Yoga practitioners and vegetarians. She first picked up her dad's guitar at the early age of seven. At fourteen, she started exploring her writing abilities and by sixteen, she had written her first original composition.

Her lyrics are highly influenced by the Vedic and the Filipino culture that speaks about her heritage, essence, function, and position in life. Her music is rooted in folk infused with rock and world music.

Nityalila (using her first name as her band's name) is an independent group of Filipino musicians advocating Filipino Pride, Human Rights, and Environmental Issues through Music and the Arts. It was formed in 2003 by singer-songwriter and music producer Nityalila Saulo. Joining her on stage are members Miko Aguilar on bass, Sandy Baliong on drums, Tim Cada on guitars, Vaishnava on percussions, and sometimes joined by other independent musicians all over the world for collaborations.

In its seven years of existence, the group has performed regularly in both local and international stages that supports their advocacies, such as Fete Dela Musique, Arts and Music Festival, Earth Day Jam, Sunrise Music Festival, Peace Camp Concert, UP Fair, NU107 Concert Series, Jam88.3 Concert Series, Cultural Center of the Philippines Concert Series, The Taiwan Yoga Festival, The 1st Bitan Music Festival in Bitan Taiwan, and The 2009 Migration Music Festival in Chiayi County and Taipei Taiwan and at the 2010 Tainan International Arts Festival.

The group has also produced three all-original albums such as “Nityalila Bootleg” released in 2003 by Nityalila in partnership with Rock Radio Cafe, “Uno Jornal” released in 2005 by independent label, Bagani Music, and “Ako’y Isang Pinay”, released in 2007 by Manna Records in partnership with Universal Records. Nityalila Saulo was also part of JAM88.3's “Not Another Christmas Album” released in 2006 by EMI Music Philippines.

Nityalila Saulo was nominated Best Performance by a New Female Recording Artist at the 2008 Awit Awards, spearheaded by PARI (The Philippine Association of the Record Industry, Inc.), that gives recognition to Filipino performing artists and people behind the making of Filipino recorded music.

Nityalila (Band) was born out of the realization that artists and musicians have the “powers” to empower, educate, and inspire the people, especially the youth, towards embracing our own culture and from there, creating original art forms and music.

She is also an active member of Dakila, Philippine Collective for Modern Heroism — A collective of Filipino artists, musicians, and students that recognize that the Philippine society is in desperate need of change. A proud member and volunteer of Yabang Pinoy, a campaign that hopes to unite the Filipino people in believing in Filipino products, in themselves and in fellow Filipinos. Nityalila is also the founder and producer of Flippyknows, a community where Filipinos all over the world converge to share creativity and technology with each other.

Albums
 Neknekmo Live Sessions, 3tracks (Bootleg) (2001)
 Uno Jornal, 5 tracks (EP) (2003)
 Ako'y Isang Pinay, 13 tracks , featuring a revival of "Ako'y Isang Pinoy" by Florante (May 30, 2007), Manna Records

References

www.nityalila.com

Living people
Filipino singer-songwriters
Year of birth missing (living people)